Kim Clijsters was the two-time defending champion, but did not compete this year due to an injury on her left wrist.

Lindsay Davenport won the title, as her opponent, World No. 1 Amélie Mauresmo retired due to an injury following the end of the first set.

Seeds
The top four seeds received a bye into the second round.

Draw

Finals

Top half

Bottom half

References

External links
 Official results archive (ITF)
 Official results archive (WTA)

Singles
Porsche Tennis Grand Prix